is a Japanese manga artist who has been creating manga since 1998. Most of her manga are written under the yaoi and yuri genre.

Biography
She is the grandchild of former Prime minister of Japan Noboru Takeshita and the older sister of rock singer Daigo. She lived in Ichikawa, Chiba but had to move back to Tokyo after her grandfather became the prime minister of Japan.

As of 11 January 2016, she is the sister-in-law of actress Keiko Kitagawa.

One of her good friends, also a fellow manga artist, is Mikiyo Tsuda, otherwise known as Taishi Zaō. They often co-author manga together, display their art together, and have autograph sessions together, among other things. Eiki Eiki has even been known to sometimes act as Taishi Zaō's manager. Eiki Eiki's persona is that of a rabbit wearing a red bow tie.

Works
The Art of Loving
Dear Myself
Unmei ni Kiss - sequel
World's End - sequel
Prime Minister
Train Train
Yuigon
Scissors Sisters - coauthored with Daigo and drawn by Marico.

Co-authored with Taishi Zaō
Color (1999)
Haru Natsu Aki Fuyu (2007) - a collection of yuri stories that were serialized in Yuri Hime, such as She-Wolf and First Kiss.
Love DNA Double X
Love Stage!!

References

External links
 Eiki Eiki's website 
 Interview with Eiki Eiki 
 

 
1971 births
Japanese female comics artists
Female comics writers
Living people
20th-century Japanese women writers
20th-century Japanese writers
21st-century Japanese women writers
21st-century Japanese writers
Manga artists from Tokyo
Women manga artists